Walter Boucquet (11 May 1941 in Meulebeke – 10 February 2018 in Ingelmunster) was a Belgian cyclist.

Major results

1963
3rd Grand Prix des Nations
3rd Trofeo Baracchi
1964
1st Stage 12 Giro d'Italia
1st Brussels–Ingooigem
1st Grand Prix des Nations
1st Stage 6 Volta a Portugal
1965
4th overall Tour de Suisse
1966
1st Stage 2a Four Days of Dunkirk
1st Omloop van het Houtland
1967
3rd Kuurne–Brussels–Kuurne
1968
1st Overall Tour de l'Oise
1st Omloop van het Houtland
1969
1st Stage 3 Grand Prix du Midi Libre

References

1941 births
2018 deaths
Belgian male cyclists
People from Meulebeke
Cyclists from West Flanders